Teofilio "Ed" Fidow (born 11 September 1993) is a Samoan rugby union who plays wing for Rugby New York (Ironworkers) of Major League Rugby (MLR) in the United States. He also plays for the Manu  internationally.

Professional rugby career

Fidow began his career in New Zealand with the Papatoetoe RFC in the Auckland Gallagher Shield competition, Earning selection for the Auckland Sevens squad.

In 2015, Fidow was selected for the Samoa rugby sevens team as part of the World Rugby Sevens Series. He played two seasons with Samoa Sevens, scoring 21 tries in 46 Appearances. 

In 2017, Fidow moved to Australia to play with Wests Rugby in the Queensland Premier Rugby Competition Fidow was spotted by Brad Thorn and selected for Brisbane City for the 2017 National Rugby Championship.

Later on in 2017, Fidow was selected as a medical joker for Bordeaux-Begles in the French top 14 season, staying until the end of the season.

In May 2018, Fidow was selected for the Samoan national team for the first time to play in the Pacific Nations Cup.

Following on from his Samoan selection, the newly promoted Provence rugby contracted him for the 2018-19 Pro D2 competition. 

Fidow was selected for the Samoan team for the 2019 Rugby World Cup.

Fidow has signed with Worcester Warriors for the 2019-2021 Premiership rugby seasons.

References

External links
 

1993 births
Living people
Samoan rugby union players
Samoa international rugby union players
Union Bordeaux Bègles players
Provence Rugby players
Worcester Warriors players
Manawatu rugby union players
Brisbane City (rugby union) players
Rugby union wings
Rugby New York players